The 1955 Mediterranean Games, officially known as the II Mediterranean Games, and commonly known as Barcelona 1955, were the 2nd Mediterranean Games. The Games were held in Barcelona, Spain over 10 days, from 15 to 25 July 1955, where 1,135 athletes (all men) from 10 countries participated. There were a total of 102 medal events from 19 different sports.
In the medals table France was first on the podium, Italy second and Spain came third.

This second edition were held in the Olympic Stadium and Palace of Sport of Barcelona. The stadium was built in 1929 and was especially renovated for the occasion. The symbol of an amphora filled with Mediterranean Sea water was then used for the first time.

Participating nations
The following is a list of nations that participated in the 1955 Mediterranean Games:

 (169)
 (278)
 (73)
 (195)
 (34)
 (4)
 (14)
 (287)
 (41)
 (40)

Venues
Estadi Olímpic de Montjuïc: athletics, opening and closing ceremonies
Palau dels Esports de Barcelona
Piscina Municipal de Montjuïc: Swimming, Diving, Water Polo

Sports

The second Mediterranean Games sports program featured 19 sports encompassing 102 men-only events. The number in parentheses next to the sport is the number of medal events per sport.

Medal table
The rankings sort by the number of gold medals earned by a country. The number of silvers is taken into consideration next and then the number of bronze. Equal ranking is given and they are listed alphabetically if after the above, countries are still tied. This follows the system used by the IOC, and IAAF.

External links
International Mediterranean Games Committee
Mediterranean Games Athletic results at gbrathletics website

 
M
1955
M
Multi-sport events in Spain
Mediterranean Games
Mediterranean Games by year
Sports competitions in Barcelona
1950s in Barcelona
July 1955 sports events in Europe
1955 in Catalonia